The 1998–99 Sri Lankan cricket season featured a Test series between Sri Lanka and India.  Sri Lanka then played a further series against Australia.

Honours
 Premier Trophy – Bloomfield C & AC
 Premier Limited Overs Tournament – Colts Cricket Club 
 Most runs – TM Dilshan 1027 @ 51.35 (HS 194)
 Most wickets – PP Wickramasinghe 76 @ 13.01 (BB 8-47)

Test series
India played in Sri Lanka as part of the 1998-99 Asian Test Championship:
 1st Test @ Sinhalese Sports Club Ground, Colombo – match drawn

Sri Lanka won the three-match Test series against Australia 1–0 with 2 matches drawn:
 1st Test @ Asgiriya Stadium, Kandy – Sri Lanka won by 6 wickets
 2nd Test @ Galle International Stadium – match drawn
 3rd Test @ Sinhalese Sports Club Ground, Colombo – match drawn

External sources
  CricInfo – brief history of Sri Lankan cricket
 CricketArchive – Tournaments in Sri Lanka

Further reading
 Wisden Cricketers' Almanack 2000

Sri Lankan cricket seasons from 1972–73 to 1999–2000